Vahe Enfiajyan (born 24 December 1978) is a Prosperous Armenia Party member of the National Assembly of Armenia, elected in 2009 and since 14 January 2019 Vice-Speaker.

References

Living people
Members of the National Assembly (Armenia)
Prosperous Armenia politicians
1978 births
Place of birth missing (living people)